The Tallahassee Historic District Zones I And II is a U.S. historic district in Tallahassee, Florida. One zone runs along Calhoun Street between Georgia and Tennessee Streets; the other along East Park Avenue between Gadsden and Calhoun Streets. On October 26, 1972, it was added to the U.S. National Register of Historic Places.

Parts of them are included in the Calhoun Street Historic District and the Park Avenue Historic District.

References

External links
 Leon County listings at National Register of Historic Places

Geography of Tallahassee, Florida
National Register of Historic Places in Tallahassee, Florida
Historic districts on the National Register of Historic Places in Florida